Res Jost   (10 January 1918 – 3 October 1990) was a Swiss theoretical physicist, who worked mainly  in constructive quantum field theory.

Biography 
Res Jost was born on January 10, 1918, in Bern. He is the son of the physics teacher Wilhelm Jost and Hermine Spycher. In 1949 Jost married the Viennese physicist Hilde Fleischer. Jost studied in Bern and at the University of Zurich, where he received his doctorate in 1946 under the supervision of the German physicist Gregor Wentzel. He then spent half a year with Niels Bohr in Copenhagen, where he introduced the Jost function into scattering theory. Afterwards, he worked as an assistant of Wolfgang Pauli in Zurich. From 1949 to 1955 he was at the Institute for Advanced Study in Princeton, where he worked with Walter Kohn, Joaquin Mazdak Luttinger and Abraham Pais among others. From 1955, he was associate professor for theoretical physics at ETH and starting from 1959 full professor. In 1964, he and Rudolf Haag created the journal Communications in Mathematical Physics. He died on October 3, 1990, in Zurich.

Jost researched quantum-mechanical scattering theory (also inverse scattering theory: Reconstruction of potentials from scattering data) and the mathematical quantum field theory, where he in 1958 with the methods of Arthur Strong Wightman proved the PCT theorem and in 1957 introduced the Jost-Lehmann-Dyson-representation, an integral representation of the expectancy value of the commutator of two field operators.

Honors and awards 
Since 1977 Jost was corresponding member of the United States National Academy of Sciences. In 1984 Jost received the Max Planck Medal for outstanding achievements in theoretical physics.

Selected works

See also 

 Axiomatic quantum field theory
 Communications in Mathematical Physics
 Constructive quantum field theory
 CPT symmetry
 Edge-of-the-wedge theorem
 Inverse scattering transform
 Jost function
 Quantum field theory

References

Further reading

External links 

 .
 .
 .
 
 

1918 births
1990 deaths
Swiss physicists
Academic staff of ETH Zurich
Foreign associates of the National Academy of Sciences
University of Zurich alumni
20th-century Swiss scientists
Quantum physicists
Swiss science writers
20th-century Swiss non-fiction writers
People from Bern
Theoretical physicists
Winners of the Max Planck Medal